Neuvy-Bouin is a commune in the Deux-Sèvres department in western France.

Geography
It is situated about 8 km north of Secondigny, 19 km west of Parthenay and 20 km south of Bressuire.

See also
Communes of the Deux-Sèvres department

References

Communes of Deux-Sèvres